Saint Mary's College in Juba (SMUJ) is a university in Juba, in Juba County, Jubek State, in South Sudan. The city of Juba is the capital of South Sudan and is the largest city in that country.

History
St. Mary's College was founded in 2008, as a collaborative effort between the South Sudanese Ministry of Gender, Social Welfare and Religious Affairs and the Roman Catholic Archdiocese of Juba, with the cooperation of the Volunteers' Organization for International Co-operation OVCI la Nostra Famiglia (INGO which has been continuously working in South Sudan since 1983). Enrollment is open to all eligible citizens of South Sudan. The Vice Chancellor of the university is Paulino Lukudu Loro, the Roman Catholic Archbishop of Juba.

Academic affairs
The university opened with two (2) faculties, namely:

 Faculty of Rehabilitation Sciences
 Faculty of Education

See also
 Juba
 Juba County
 Central Equatoria
 Equatoria
 Education in South Sudan
 List of universities in South Sudan

References

2009 establishments in South Sudan
Educational institutions established in 2009
Universities in South Sudan
Buildings and structures in Juba
Central Equatoria
Equatoria